The first mention of a "Serbian dinar" dates back to the reign of Stefan Nemanjić in 1214. Until the fall of the Serbian Despotate in 1459, most of the Serbian rulers minted silver dinar coins. 
The first Serbian dinars, like many other Southern European coins, replicated Venetian grosso, including characters in Latin (the word dux replaced with the word rex). For many years it was one of the main export articles of medieval Serbia, considering the relative abundance of silver coming from Serbian mines. Venetians were weary of this, and Dante Alighieri went so far as to put the Serbian king of his time, Stefan Milutin, in Hell as forgerer (along with his Portuguese and Norwegian counterparts):

Emperor Stefan Dušan adopted the Byzantine hyperpyron (perper), a large unit of currency: the imperial tax was one perper per year per house.

Gallery

See also

Serbian dinar
Medieval Bulgarian coinage

References

Sources

 
 

 

 

 

Economy of Serbia in the Middle Ages
Serbia
Old Serbian inscriptions